Polish Club (Polish: Wspólny Język, literally "Common Language") is a bridge bidding system which was developed in Poland, where it is the most popular bidding system, and which is also used by players of other countries. It is a type of small club system.

In the Polish Club, a 1♣ opening bid is forcing for one round but does not necessarily show a strong hand; in most versions of this system it shows either a weak balanced hand (about 12-14HCP), a natural 1♣ opening or any strong hand. Consequently, bids of 1♦, 1♥ and 1♠ are limited to about 18HCP, and also 1♦ shows at least four diamonds (five in some versions of the system).

The 2♣ opening is usually reserved to show a limited hand with long clubs and possibly a four-card major, similar to the Precision 2♣ opening.

The following outline of the system is based on that given in System licytacyjny Wspólny Język 2005 - opis skrócony ("Polish Club 2005 - a brief description") by Krzysztof Jassem. The latest version translated into English (Polish Club International, 2010), is available here:

1♣ opening 
 12–14 HCP, no 5-card major, no 4-card diamond suit.  Five clubs are possible if the hand is balanced. Opener should not bid clubs on the next round – even in competition.
 15–17 HCP, five clubs, unbalanced distribution. Opener bids clubs in the next round.
 18+ HCP, any distribution.

1♦ response
 negative: 0–8 HCP. In the 7–8 HCP range, Responder should not have a 4-card major (the response of one of a major is 7+ HCP, the 1NT response is 9–11 HCP).
 9–11 unbalanced; either both minors (5-4), or one poor minor. (The hand does not qualify for any of the responses: 1NT, 2 in a minor, 3 in a minor).
 12–16 HCP balanced without a 4-card major. The hand is not suitable for declaring no trumps.
1♣ - 1♦
?
1♥/1♠ = better major (3 cards is possible)
1NT = 18–19 HCP, balanced
2♣ = 15+ HCP, natural
2♦ = artificial GF, exclusive of 2-suiter hands
2♥, 2♠, 3♣, 3♦ = 5+ in the bid suit, semi-forcing
2NT = 22–24 HCP, balanced
3♥/3♠/4♣ = GF, 2-suiter (5-5):
3♥ – with hearts, then Responder’s 3♠ shows preference over hearts, 3NT asks for a minor, 4♣, 4♦ are cue bids with agreed hearts, 3♠ – spades and a minor, then 3NT asks for a minor, 4♣, 4♦ are cue bids, 4♣ – minors.

1♥/1♠ responses
7+HCP, 4+ cards, can have longer minor if less than GF

1♣ - 1♥/1♠
?
2♣ = 15+, one-round force, then Responder’s 2♦ forces to game.
2♦ = Relay, 18+ HCP, promises at least 3 cards in Responder’s major.
2♥ = (After 1♠ response) 5+♥, (18+ HCP), GF
2NT = 18+ HCP, (semi-)balanced, denies 3-card support in Responder’s suit.
After 1♣-1♥/1♠-2♦, Responder bids as follows ("Bubrotka"):
2♥ = 7–10 HCP, 4 cards in the bid major
2♠ = 11+ HCP, 4 cards in the bid major
2NT = 11+ HCP, at least 5 cards in the bid major
3♣, 3♦ = 9–11 HCP, 5 in the bid minor, 4 in the bid major
3♥ = 7–10 HCP, 5 cards, unbalanced (then 3♠ asks for a shortage, 3NT asks for a side suit)
3♠ = 7–10 HCP, 5332 with 5 in the bid major
3NT = 7–10 HCP, 6 cards in the bid major

1NT response
9–11 HCP, no 4-card major

1♣ - 1NT
?
2♣ = natural, 15+ HCP, GF
2♦, 2♥, 2♠ = 5+ cards, 18+ HCP, GF

2♣/2♦ responses
5+ cards, GF, can have 4-card major

2♥/2♠ responses
Strong jump shift (semi-solid suit)

2NT response
12+ HCP, GF no 4-card major

3♣/3♦ response
Good 6-card suit, invitational (9–11 HCP)

3♥/3♠ responses
7-card suit with 2 high honours, nothing outside

1♦ opening
4+ cards, 12–17 HCP possible canape: 4 diamonds; 5 clubs are possible if weak (12–14 HCP)

 2♣ response – natural, promises 5 clubs, one-round force.  Rebidding diamonds by Opener shows length (5 diamonds) and does not specify strength. The other 2-level bids show 4-card openings in the range of 12–14 HCP.
 2♦ response – inverted minor, 10+ HCP, 4 diamonds
 3♦ response – preemptive
  NT responses: 1NT = 7–10 HCP, 2NT = 11–12 HCP; both deny a 4-card major.

1♥/1♠ openings
5 cards, 12–17 HCP

 1NT Response – not forcing
Responder's 2NT is forcing after the suit is repeated.
1♥	1♠/1NT
2♥	2NT = forces to 3 of a major; opener shows shortage, and
1♠	1NT
2♠	2NT = forces to 3 of a major; opener shows shortage
Two-over-one response – forces to three of that suit.
 2♣ response is semi-natural.
Rebidding the suit by Opener shows a minimum and does not show length.
2NT rebid by Opener shows strength (15–17 HCP).
 2NT response – limit raise with support
 Jump raise – preemptive
Two types of Splinter bids
1♥ - 3♠ = any shortage, 9–12 HCP (then 3NT asks shortage)
1♠ - 3NT = any shortage, 9–12 HCP (then 4♣ asks shortage)
1♥ - 3NT = spade shortage, 12–16 HCP
1♥/1♠ - 4♣, 4♦, 4♥ (after 1♠) = bid shortage, 12–16 HCP
Drury-fit by a passed hand
2 of the bid major is the weakest rebid.
Jump shift by a passed hand – invitational (9–11 HCP)

1NT opening
15–17 HCP

Stayman 2♣
Opener's 2♥ does not deny four spades.
Responder's subsequent bidding is natural: forcing at
the 3-level, non-forcing at the 2-level. Also:
1NT - 2♣; 2♦ - 2♠ = invitational (7–9 HCP), 5 spades, 4 hearts, and
1NT - 2♣; 2♥/2♠ - 3♦/3♥ = transfer, agrees Opener's suit, GF
 Jacoby transfers 2♦/2♥
Transfer to hearts (2♦) does not deny five spades.
Responder's new suit at the 3-level forces to game. Also:
1NT - 2♦; 2♥ - 2♠ forces to 3♥ (8+ HCP)
 2♠ response – transfer for clubs.  Opener may choose between a positive 2NT, and a negative 3♣. Responder may continue by showing shortage.
 2NT response – limit
 3♣ response – transfer to diamonds, weak or strong Opener is obliged to bid 3♦. Responder may continue by showing shortage.
 3♦ – natural, inviting
 3♥/3♠ – 5431 convention: GF, both minors: at least 5-4, shortage in the bid suit

2♣ opening
Precision: 5 clubs and a 4−card major, or 6 clubs, 11–14 HCP

 2♦ response – relay, forcing to 3♣.  Opener shows a 4-card suit (3♦ shows extras) or makes a choice between 2NT and 3♣ with long clubs.
 2♥/2♠ response – not forcing, good 5-card suit (7–11 HCP)
 2NT response – weak support in clubs or GF two-suiter. Puppet to 3♣. Opener must bid 3♣. Responder either passes or shows his suits: 3♦ = diamonds and hearts, 3♥ = hearts and spades 3♠ = spades and diamonds.
 3♣ response – limit raise (invitational)
 3♦/3♥/3♠ response – limit, good 6-card suit

2♦ opening
Weak two in a major (limited Multi), 6+ cards, 6–11 HCP.

 2♥/2♠/3♥/3♠ response – pass or correct
 2NT – relay, forcing to 3 of the major
Opener bids:
3♣ = good opening, 3♦ relays and 3♥ shows spades. 3♠ shows hearts.
3♦ = hearts, minimum opening
3♥ = spades, minimum opening
 3♣ response – GF, any one-suited hand, puppet to 3♦.
 3♦ – game-invitational with support in both majors
Opener bids 4♣ with hearts and 4♦ with spades if the invitation is accepted.
 4♣ response – asks Opener to bids the suit below his major.  Opener bid 4♦ with hearts and 4♥ with spades.
 4♦ response – asks Opener to bids his suit.
 4♥/4♠ response – to play

2♥/2♠ openings
Polish two−suiters, 6–11 HCP.

 Opening 2♥ = any 5-5 with hearts (spades possible)
 2♠ response = pass or correct
 2NT response – asks for another suit.  With hearts and spades Opener bids 3♥.  Other responses – natural
 Opening 2♠ = 5 spades and 5 of a minor

2NT opening
5-5 in minor, 6-11HCP.

 3♥ asks to bid a longer minor or a longer major if minors are equal.
 3♠ – natural, forcing

3NT opening
Gambling (no stopper outside)

 4♦ asks for singleton.

Conventions in an uncontested auction

Jump shift
Strong, semi−solid suit, slam interest

Fourth suit
Invites to game after an initial one-over-one response.  Responder may pass in the subsequent bidding but Opener may not. Fourth suit forces to game after a two-over-one response.

Third suit
If Opener raises the third suit, that promises four cards in the suit and denies a stopper in the unbid suit. 3NT bid by Opener shows four cards in the third suit and promises a stopper in the unbid suit.

Forcing 2NT
Responder's 2NT is forcing after a two-over-one response.

Odwrotka
After a 1♣ opening and a response in a major, 2♦ is Odwrotka (a "fit reverse"), that shows an 18+ hand, a fit, and asks responder to describe his hand. Jassem recommends replacing WJ2000's "Odwrotka" with the "Bubrotka" responses above.

2♣ – check back
Weak with clubs or game invitational, or game forcing  Opener's rebids:
 2♦ = minimum opening, no 3-card support
 2 in Responder's suit = minimum opening, 3-card support
 2 in the other major = nice opening, 3-card support
 2NT = nice opening, no 3-card support
Responder's continuations: 3♣ signs off. 2 in the bid major is non-forcing (10–12 HCP). Other bids (including 2NT) are game forcing.

En passant
In an uncontested auction, stoppers are shown. In competition, bidding the opponent's suit asks for a stopper. If opponents bid two suits, bidding the higher-level suit promises stopper in the lower-level suit.

Slam bidding

Roman Key Card Blackwood 1430
5♣ = 1 or 4,
5♦ = 0 or 3,
5♥ = 2 or 5 no trump queen,
5♠ = 2 and a trump queen, etc.

Exclusion Key Card Blackwood (1430 responses)
After trump agreement, an unusual jump shift at the 5-level (or 4♠ when hearts are agreed) asks for key cards, exclusive of the ace of the bid suit.

Hoyt
The cheapest bid after key cards are shown asks for kings. The next cheapest bid shows no kings, etc.

5NT
Kind of Josephine; asks for the number of high honours (ace, king or queen) in trumps 6♣ = 0, 6♦ = 1, etc.

Cue bids
First− and second−round controls are treated as equals

Splinter bids
Weaker and stronger types after 1♥/1♠ openings
1♥ – 3♠ = weaker Splinter (9–12 HCP), any shortage, 3NT asks
1♥ – 3NT = regular Splinter (12–16 HCP), spade shortage
1♠ – 3NT = weaker Splinter, any shortage, 4♣ asks
1♥/1♠ – 4♣/4♦/4♥ = regular Splinters (12–16 HCP)

AutoSplinter
An unusual shift jump agrees bidder's own suit only if partner has not shown any suit.

Six in the Splinter suit
Asks partner to bid the grand slam with a void in the splinter-suit.

Interference after Blackwood
DOPI.  Double = 0, pass = 1, the cheapest bid = 2 keycards, etc.

Competitive bidding

Over opponent’s takeout double
 Jump shift – suit and support (fit showing jump)
 New suit – forcing at 1-level (except 1♦; see below), non-forcing at 2-level
 Redouble = 10+ HCP
Opener bids before Responder: this shows a minimum if the bid is cheaper than two in the opening bid, but shows extras otherwise.
 1♦ response over opponent's double – natural, not forcing
 Support bidding after partner's 1♥/1♠ opening is doubled:
 1NT = 7–9(10) HCP; 3-card support
 2NT = limit raise: 4-card support
 Jump shift shows suit and support.

Over opponent’s overcall
 New suit is forcing at the level of 1 and 3. New suit is not forcing at the level of 2.
 Jump raise is pre-emptive.

Support bidding after partner’s 1♥/1♠ opening is overcalled
2NT promises good support (usually 4 cards) and forces to game. Direct cue bid is game-invitational, or game forcing with flat distribution and defensive values.

After partner’s 1NT opening is overcalled
 Double is negative – part score range.
 New suit is non-forcing at the two-level, but forcing at the three-level.
 Lebensohl: either GF with 4 cards in the other major or non-forcing with an unbid suit.

After partner’s 2♦/2♥/2♠ opening is overcalled
 New suit = pass or correct.
 Double is for penalties.

Negative double
Through 4♦ Negative doubles include, apart from standard agreements, forcing hands with a weak 5-card suit and – after 1♥/1♠ opening – invitational no-trump hands.

When the second defender overcalls
 Support double.  A support double does not show extras but promises offensive values.
 After a 1♣ opening, double is two-way: either a support double or a stronger variant of the opening.

Defensive bidding

No−trump hands
 1NT and 2NT non-jump overcalls – 15–18 HCP with a stopper.  Subsequent bidding: the same as after a 1NT opening
 1NT re-opening – 12–15 HCP.  Subsequent bidding: the same as after a 1NT opening
 2NT re-opening – 19–21 HCP Subsequent bidding: similar to after the 1NT opening
 Jump overcalls – direct: natural, pre−emptive; re−opening: constructive
 Takeout doubles and strong doubles (17+HCP).  Takeout doubles promise three cards in unbid majors and two cards in unbid minors. Equal level conversion shows extras.
 After partner has doubled 1♣, a 1♦ bid is negative, other 1-level suit bids are forcing.

After 2♦ artificial opening (Multi or Wilkosz)
Second hand's double is for takeout of spades. Pass and then double after 2♥/3♥ in the next round is for takeout of hearts:
2♦ dble 2♥ dble = responsive
2♦ dble 2♠ dble = punitive
Fourth hand's live double is for takeout:
2♦ pass 2♥/2♠ dble = takeout of hearts/spades respectively

Direct cue bid
Michaels cue bid – unlimited

Jump cue bid
Jump cue bid shows either a solid suit and asks for a stopper or shows any game-forcing one-suiter hand.

Versus strong 1 NT opening
 Double shows two suits: 5+ cards in a minor, 4+ cards in a major.
 2♣ = major two-suiter
 2♦ = 6+ card in one major
 2♥/2♠ = 5 cards in the bid suit and a 4-card minor

Versus weak 1NT opening
Double is for takeout. Other bids show the same shape as versus
a strong no trump and promise opening values.

Other
 Drury (2♣) promises fit, rebidding the suit is weakest bid.
 Lebensohl after 2♥/2♠ and partner's double

Leads and signals
 Leads are 2nd best from bad suits (low from two); 4th best from good suits; top of honours; ace from ace-king, king from king- -queen, etc., except 9 from 109x(x).
 Signals are upside down throughout. In partner's led suit, count is preferred in suit contracts, attitude is preferred in no trump contracts.
 Echo against no trump contracts – a small card in declarer's first-played suit (from either hand) accepts the lead. Lavinthal – standard way (discouraging in the suit discarded, suit preference for the other 2 suits).

External links
 Summary of Polish Club
 Wspólny język 2005(Polish standard)
 SAYC+ is a small club system similar to Polish Standard

Bridge systems